The 2011–12 Baylor Lady Bears women's basketball team represented Baylor University in the 2011–12 NCAA Division I women's basketball season. Returning as head coach was Hall of Famer Kim Mulkey. The team plays its home games at the Ferrell Center in Waco, Texas and are members of the Big 12 Conference.

The Lady Bears began the season as the preseason #1 team in both the Associated Press and the Coaches' Poll.  They ran through the season undefeated, winning the Big 12 regular season and the Big 12 Tournament.  They became the first team in college basketball history (men's or women's) to finish 40–0 by defeating Notre Dame for the national championship. (In 2014 Connecticut matched the Lady Bears 40-0 mark, tying an NCAA record.)

Roster

Schedule

|-
!colspan=9| Regular season

|-
!colspan=9| Big 12 tournament

|-
!colspan=9| NCAA tournament

See also
2011-12 Baylor Bears basketball team

Baylor Bears women's basketball seasons
Baylor Lady Bears
NCAA Division I women's basketball tournament Final Four seasons
NCAA Division I women's basketball tournament championship seasons
Baylor